Don't Break My Heart is the title of several songs, including:

 "Don't Break My Heart" (La Toya Jackson song)
 "Don't Break My Heart" (Vaya Con Dios song)
 "Don't Break My Heart" (Romeo's Daughter song)
 "Don't Break My Heart" (UB40 song)
 "Don't Break My Heart" (Nicola song)
 "Don't Break My Heart" (Italo disco project Den Harrow song from 1987)
 "Don't Break My Heart" by Black Panther
 "Don't Break My Heart" by Paolo Conte
 "Don't Break My Heart" by Suzi Quatro, from the album Aggro-Phobia

See also 
 "Don't Break My Heart Again", by Whitesnake
 Don't Go Breaking My Heart (disambiguation)